Korniychuk is a Ukrainian surname. Notable people with the surname include:

 Oleksandr Korniychuk (1905–1972), Ukrainian playwright, literary critic, and state official
 Serhiy Korniychuk (born 1965), Ukrainian army officer
 Yevgen Korniychuk (born 1966), Ukrainian politician and diplomat

Ukrainian-language surnames